Jessee is a given name and surname. It is a variant spelling of Jesse or Jessie.

Given name
Jessee Wyatt (born 1996), Australian Paralympic athlete

Surname
The 2010 United States Census found 4,108 people with the surname Jessee, making it the 8,067th-most-common name in the country, compared with 3,952 people (7,752nd-most-common) in the 2000 Census. In both censuses, more than 95% of the bearers of the surname identified as white.

Dan Jessee (1901–1970), American baseball player
Margaret Jessee (1921–2001), American tennis player and vintner
Dean C. Jessee (born 1929), American historian
Jason Jessee (born 1969), American professional skateboarder
Darren Jessee (born 1971), American drummer

See also
McGarrah Jessee, American marketing company founded in 1996
Jessee/Miller Field, football field, named in part for Dan Jessee
Jessey
Jessy (disambiguation)

References